Stradzewo  is a village in the administrative district of Gmina Zbąszynek, within Świebodzin County, Lubusz Voivodeship, in western Poland.

The village has a population of 30.

References

Stradzewo